Caeleb Remel Dressel  (born August 16, 1996) is an American professional swimmer who specializes in freestyle, butterfly, and individual medley events. He swims representing the Cali Condors as part of the International Swimming League. He won a record seven gold medals at the 2017 World Aquatics Championships in Budapest, nine medals, six of which were gold, at the 2018 World Swimming Championships in Hangzhou, and eight medals, including six gold, at the 2019 World Aquatics Championships in Gwangju. Dressel is a seven-time Olympic gold medalist and holds world records in the 100 meter butterfly (long course and short course), 50 meter freestyle (short course), and 100 meter individual medley (short course).

At the 2020 Summer Olympics in Tokyo, Dressel won five gold medals, which made him the fifth American to win five gold medals in a single Olympic Games after 1970. Mark Spitz, Michael Phelps, Eric Heiden, and Matt Biondi were the other four. He also became the first male swimmer in the history of swimming at the modern Olympic Games, since 1896, to win gold medals in the 50 meter freestyle, the 100 meter freestyle, and the 100 meter butterfly at the same Olympics.

Dressel holds American records in the 50 meter and 100 meter freestyle, 50 meter and 100 meter butterfly (all long course meters). He also holds American records in the 50 yard and 100 yard freestyle events, the 100 yard butterfly, and the 200 yard individual medley, and formerly held a national record in the 100 yard breaststroke. Over the course of his collegiate career, he won NCAA titles in the 50 yard freestyle, 100 yard freestyle, and 100 yard butterfly individual events.

Early life
Dressel was born on August 16, 1996, in Green Cove Springs, Florida, the son of Christina and Michael Dressel. His father is a veterinarian specializing in urgent care for cats and dogs. Dressel is the third of four children; his three siblings, one brother and two sisters, plus his father were all competitive swimmers setting records and earning honors across the high school and university levels. He and his siblings learned to swim at a young age, for him when he was 4 years old, and by the time Dressel was 8 years old he had committed to competitive year-round swimming.

Dressel attended Clay High School in Green Cove Springs, Florida, and trained with the Bolles School Sharks in Jacksonville where he met his then training partner and now wife, Meghan Haila. He was a collegiate swimmer at the University of Florida starting in 2014 and majored in Resources and Conservation. As of April 2020, Caeleb is 15 hours short of graduating with his degree.

Career

2012
He led off a 50-Yard free relay in 19.82, where he became the first swimmer under 16 years old to break 20 seconds.

2012 US Olympic Trials
At the 2012 United States Olympic Trials, Dressel was the youngest male swimmer at 15 years of age and ranked 100th in the 200 meter individual medley in a time of 2:08.08, 121st in the 100 meter butterfly at 57.21 seconds, 121st with a time of 1:55.17 in the 200 meter freestyle, tied for 145th in the 50 meter freestyle with a time of 23.87 seconds, and tied for 152nd in the 100 meter freestyle with his time of 52.21 seconds. After not making the 2012 US Olympic Team, Dressel refocused and set his sights on the 2016 Summer Olympics.

2013

2013 World Junior Championships

When Dressel was 17 years old, he won six medals, including a gold medal in the 100 meter freestyle in which he broke the Championships record with his time of 48.97 seconds, at the 2013 FINA World Junior Swimming Championships in Dubai, United Arab Emirates in August 2013. His time also broke the National Age Group record set by Michael Phelps in the 100 meter freestyle in 2004 for the 17–18 year old age group by eight hundredths of a second. His other medals were in the 4x100 meter freestyle relay and the mixed 4x100 meter freestyle relay, where he won a silver medal in each event, and in the 50 meter freestyle, 4x200 meter freestyle relay, and the mixed 4x100 meter medley relay in which he won a bronze medal in each. In addition to the events Dressel medaled in, he competed in the 200 meter freestyle where he finished sixth with a time of 1:49.29 and swam in the final of the 4x100 meter medley relay which did not place as it was disqualified. In total, his medal breakdown was one gold medal, two silver medals, and three bronze medals.

2013 US Junior National Championships
At the 2013 Speedo Winter Junior National Championships (the USA Swimming sanctioned national championship meet for 18 and under swimmers), Dressel became the youngest swimmer in history to break the 19 second barrier in the 50 yard freestyle, swimming an 18.94 to lead off his club team's relay.

2015

2015 NCAA Championships
During his freshman year at the University of Florida, Dressel won the 2015 NCAA title in the 50 yard freestyle when he was 18 years old with a time of 18.67 seconds, which was his first NCAA title, the first NCAA title for the Florida Gators in the men's 50 yard freestyle, and set a new 17—18 national age group record in the event. With his performance, Dressel also became the fastest freshman in the 50 yard freestyle in the history of the NCAA and the second-fastest American in the event, only behind Nathan Adrian.

2015 National Championships
At the senior 2015 National Championships (long course) in San Antonio, Texas, he won two individual titles, in the 50 meter and the 100 meter freestyle. His winning time of 21.53 in the 50 meter freestyle ranked 4th in the world for 2015.

2016

2016 NCAA Championships
At the 2016 Men's NCAA Division I Championships, he broke the American and US Open records in the 50-yard freestyle with a time of 18.20 and the 100-yard freestyle with 40.46.

2016 US Olympic Trials
At the 2016 US Olympic Trials, Dressel made the 2016 US Olympic Team in the 100 meter freestyle by finishing second with a time of 48.23 seconds, he also placed 4th in the 50 meter freestyle, 7th in the 100 meter butterfly, 32nd in the 200 meter freestyle, and was disqualified in the 200 meter individual medley for a false start. In addition to the five events he raced, Dressel had entered to compete in the 100 meter breaststroke with his best time of 1:02.26 and the 100 meter backstroke, and decided not to race the events. Dressel's performances leading up to and at the 2016 US Olympic Trials earned him recognition as America's best young sprinter by Sports Illustrated and CBS News. Overall, Dressel and coach Gregg Troy chose a forwards mentality to Dressel's training, with Troy expressing Dressel's best could still be four, eight, or more years down the road.

2016 Summer Olympics

At the 2016 Summer Olympics in Rio de Janeiro, Brazil, Dressel won his first Olympic medal, a gold medal, in the 4×100 meter freestyle relay. In the final, he swam the first leg in 48.10 seconds, which was the second-fastest lead-off relay leg in the finals heat, and was followed by relay teammates Michael Phelps, Ryan Held, and Nathan Adrian in that order. The American team recorded a time of 3:09.92. Of the 13 medals won by Florida Gators at the 2020 Summer Olympics, Dressel became the first athlete to win a medal from the University's sports teams with this gold medal. Dressel and his finals relay teammates earned USA Swimming's Golden Goggle Award for best relay performance of the year in 2016 for their efforts. Dressel and his teammates shared tears in the medal ceremony and while doing a victory lap around the pool after they received their medals, their tearful reactions were highlighted by local news outlet The Florida Times-Union. The relay was also highlighted by SwimSwam as one of their five unforgettable moments of the 2016 Summer Olympics.

In the 100 meter freestyle, Dressel finished sixth in the final in a time of 48.02 seconds with fellow United States swimmer Nathan Adrian taking the bronze medal and Kyle Chalmers of Australia winning the gold medal.

Dressel also swam freestyle in the heats of the 4×100 meter medley relay, and won his second gold medal of the 2016 Olympic Games when the finals relay of Ryan Murphy (backstroke), Cody Miller (breaststroke), Michael Phelps (butterfly), and Nathan Adrian (freestyle) placed first in Olympic record time. He swam a time of 47.74 seconds for the freestyle leg of the prelims relay consisting of him, David Plummer (backstroke), Kevin Cordes (breaststroke), and Tom Shields (butterfly).

2017

2017 NCAA Championships
His junior year of collegiate swimming and leading up to the 2013 NCAA Championships, Dressel became the second person to split under 18.00 seconds for 50 yards of freestyle on a relay, splitting a 17.90 on the 4×50 yard medley relay at the 2017 Southeastern Conference Championships, which was just 0.04 seconds off the fastest split time of 17.86 seconds swam by Vladimir Morozov his junior year in 2013. At the 2017 NCAA Division I Championships, he broke the American and US Open records in the 100-yard butterfly and the 100-yard freestyle with times of 43.58 and 40.00, respectively. He also tied his 50 freestyle record with an 18.20, the same as the preceding year.

2017 World Championships

At the 2017 World Aquatics Championships in Budapest, Hungary, Dressel won seven gold medals and set numerous American records. Dressel was named the male swimmer of the meet. He also became the second swimmer to win seven gold medals at a single World Championships, after Michael Phelps in 2007.

On the first day of competition, July 23, Dressel set the American record in the 50 meter butterfly with a time of 22.76, topping the semifinals. Later that evening in the 4×100 meter freestyle relay, Dressel set the American record in the 100 meter freestyle with a time of 47.26 in the leadoff leg. Combined with Townley Haas, Blake Pieroni, and Nathan Adrian, the American team won gold with a time of 3:10.06, earning him his first gold of the Championships.

On day two, Dressel finished fourth in the 50 meter butterfly final with a time of 22.89, missing a medal by 0.05 seconds. On day four, Dressel took part in the 4×100 meter mixed medley relay, swimming the butterfly leg and splitting a 49.92. Along with teammates Matt Grevers, Lilly King, and Simone Manuel, the American team won gold in a new world-record time of 3:38.56. That time broke the record set earlier in the day by Ryan Murphy, Kevin Cordes, Kelsi Worrell, and Mallory Comerford. On day five, Dressel re-set the 100-meter freestyle American record with a 47.17 in the 100 meter freestyle final, en route to winning gold by a margin of 0.70 seconds over silver medalist and teammate Nathan Adrian.

On day seven, Dressel became the first swimmer ever to win three gold medals on a single day. He won the 50 meter freestyle in 21.15, a new world textile best time. Half an hour later he won the 100 meter butterfly in 49.86, again a new world textile best and 0.04 seconds above the world record held by Michael Phelps. The third gold medal came in the 4×100 meter mixed freestyle relay, where he led off in 47.22. Dressel and teammates Adrian, Comerford, and Manuel broke the world record for this relay with a time of 3:19.60.

On the eighth and last day of competition, Dressel won his 7th gold in the 4×100-meter medley relay. Swimming the butterfly leg, Dressel recorded a time of 49.76 and the American team of Matt Grevers, Kevin Cordes, and Nathan Adrian won with a time of 3:27.91.

2018

2018 SEC Championships
At the 2018 Southeastern Conference, SEC, Swimming and Diving Championships in College Station, Texas in February, Dressel lowered his best time in the 100 yard breaststroke from a 51.88 to a 50.03, which broke the former American, US Open, and NCAA records set by Kevin Cordes in 2014 at 50.04 by one hundredth of a second. Earlier in the Championships, Dressel also set a new American record in the 200 yard individual medley with his time of 1:38.13, lowering the record set by David Nolan in 2015 by 0.25 seconds. Dressel's 100 yard breaststroke record garnered the attention of 2016 Olympic bronze medalist in breaststroke, Cody Miller, who produced a perspective piece on the American record and posted it to his, Miller's, YouTube channel less than two weeks after Dressel broke the record. Later on, in August 2020, Dressel provided his analysis of the record in a video and put it on his own YouTube channel.

2018 NCAA Championships

At the 2018 NCAA Division I Men's Swimming and Diving Championships in March, Dressel won all three of his individual races, and won his first relay national title.

On day 2 of the competition, March 22, 2018, Dressel broke the NCAA, American, and US Open records in the 50 yard freestyle thrice. He first swam an 18.11 in the individual preliminaries race in the morning session. He later improved upon that record in the evening leading off The University of Florida's national championship winning relay with a 17.81 split, and finalized his record with a 17.63 in the 50 yard freestyle final. The next day, he broke the American and US open records in the 100 yard butterfly, swimming a 42.80. On the final day of competition, Dressel won the 100 yard freestyle by more than a second in a time of 39.90, completing his sweep of individual events for a second time. This secured him CSCAA Swimmer of the Meet honors for the third year in a row, as he became the first swimmer ever to break the 18 second 50 free barrier, the 40 second 100 free barrier, and the 43 second 100 fly barrier in the history of yards swimming. His split of 17.30 on the 4×50 yard medley relay marked the fastest 50 yard freestyle split time in the history of the NCAA.

2018 National Championships
In advance of the 2018 National Championships, Dressel was highlighted by NBC Sports as one of ten swimmers to watch at the meet with his entries in the 50 meter freestyle, 50 meter breaststroke, 50 meter butterfly, 100 meter freestyle, 100 meter breaststroke, 100 meter butterfly, 200 meter freestyle, and 200 meter individual medley. At the 2018 US National Championships held in July 2018 in Irvine, California, Dressel won the 100 meter butterfly with a time of 50.50 seconds after finishing second in the 50 meter butterfly and sixth in the 100 meter freestyle. Dressel's win in the 100 meter butterfly secured him a spot on the Pan Pacific Championships team, where he could also compete in the 100 meter freestyle even though he finished sixth because qualified athletes were allowed to compete in any event at the meet. He also placed second in the 50 meter freestyle with a time of 21.67, just 0.18 seconds behind Michael Andrew, and decided not to swim the 50 meter breaststroke, 100 meter breaststroke, 200 meter freestyle, and 200 meter individual medley.

2018 Pan Pacific Championships

In August 2018 at the 2018 Pan Pacific Championships in Tokyo, Japan, Dressel won the 100 meter butterfly after tying for second place in the 100 meter freestyle. His winning time of 50.75 seconds in the 100 meter butterfly set a new Championships record in the event. He won the silver medal in the 50 meter freestyle with a time of 21.93, finishing only behind fellow American Michael Andrew, and won a gold medal in the 4x100 meter medley relay alongside Ryan Murphy who swam backstroke, Andrew Wilson who swam breaststroke, and Nathan Adrian who swam freestyle. In the mixed 4x100 meter medley relay, Dressel swam the butterfly leg of the relay with a split time of 50.50 seconds, helping the relay consisting of him, Kathleen Baker, Michael Andrew, and Simone Manuel, finish third and win the bronze medal with a final time of 3:41.74. For the 4x100 meter freestyle relay, Dressel and his relay teammates Nathan Adrian, Zach Apple, and Blake Pieroni were disqualified for not swimming in the order they had submitted to the officials. After the meet, reports surfaced that Dressel had missed two weeks of training in June while recovering from a motorcycle accident, which had perhaps hampered his performance and prevented him for equaling his times from the previous year.

2018 World Short Course Championships

At the 2018 World Short Course Championships in Hangzhou, China in December 2018, Dressel tied Kelsi Dahlia for the most number of medals won at the World Championships meet with nine medals, he won six gold medals to Dahlia's seven. He swam on the same finals relay as Olivia Smoliga in the mixed 4x50 meter medley relay, both helping set a new swimming world record in the event and win the gold medal. Dressel's efforts contributed to Smoliga's winning eight gold medals at the Championships and breaking Dressel's former Guinness World Record for "most number of gold medals won at a single FINA World Championships (individual)", which he held from 2017 when he won seven gold medals.

Dressel won the silver medal in the 100 meter butterfly with a time of 48.71 seconds, twenty-one hundredths of a second behind gold medalist Chad le Clos of South Africa. In the 4x50 meter freestyle relay, Dressel swam in the final, helped the relay earn the gold medal and set a world record in the event, and split a 20.43 on the first leg of the relay, setting a new American record in the 50 meter freestyle. For the 50 meter freestyle individual race, Dressel won the silver medal with a time of 20.54 seconds.

In the 100 meter freestyle, Dressel won the gold medal in an American record time of 39.90 seconds. Along with Blake Pieroni, Michael Chadwick, and Ryan Held in the final of the 4x100 meter freestyle relay, Dressel won a gold medal with the relay finishing in a world record time of 3:03:03. He also won a gold medal in the mixed 4x50 meter freestyle relay in world record time, a gold medal in the 4x100 meter medley relay in Americas record and Championships record time, the silver medal in the 4x50 meter medley relay in American record time, and entered as one of two male American swimmers in the 50 meter butterfly, though decided not to swim in the event at the Championships.

2019
On May 17, 2019, Dressel edged out Chase Kalisz in the 100 meter breaststroke at the 2019 Atlanta Classic in Atlanta with a time of 1:01.22 in the final, dropping over a second from his best time of 1:02.26 heading into the 2016 Olympic Trials, and qualifying for the 2020 US Olympic Trials in the event.

2019 World Championships

At the 2019 World Aquatics Championships held in Gwangju, South Korea, he first won a gold as part of the team in men's 4×100 meter freestyle relay. He then won gold in the 50 meter butterfly, an event he failed to win in 2017. He is the first American man to win that event, and he set a new national and championship record time of 22.35 seconds for the event. This is followed by a national record and the third fastest time in history (46.96) in the 100 meter freestyle.

In the 100 meter butterfly event, Dressel broke Michael Phelps' ten-year-old record by 0.32 second in the semi-final, setting a new world-record time of 49.50 seconds. He won gold in the final the following day. That same day within two hours, Dressel won two more gold medals – in the 50 meter freestyle in a Championships record time, and as part of the team in the mixed 4×100 meter freestyle relay, which was won in a world-record time of 3 minutes, 19.40 seconds.  This was a repeat of his achievement in Hungary in 2017, and it was also the first time anyone won three gold medals in one day at the Championships two times.

In the final day of the Championships, Dressel helped win a silver medal in the men's 4×100 meter medley relay. The medal was the eighth that Dressel won at the Championships, and the most medals of any type that a person had won at a single long course Championships. FINA named Dressel male swimmer of the meet, which he also won in 2017.

International Swimming League
In 2019 he was a member of the inaugural International Swimming League representing the Cali Condors, who finished third place in the final match in Las Vegas, Nevada in December. Dressel won the Most Valuable Player of the match honor in all 3 matches he participated in as well as winning the skins race each time. Dressel swam the 50 meter freestyle in Las Vegas and beat Florent Manaudou's world record of 20.26 from 2014 by going a 20.24. He also won the 100 meter freestyle, 100 meter butterfly, and 50 meter butterfly.

2020

International Swimming League 
Continuing to represent the Cali Condors, Dressel broke four world records in the 100-meter butterfly (at 47.78 seconds) and the 50-meter freestyle world record, which he already held (to 20.16 seconds). He is the first person to swim the 100-meter butterfly in less than 48 seconds. He also broke his own 100 IM record twice, dropping it to 49.88 the first time, and 49.28 the second time. These two record breaks occurred one weekend after he was the first swimmer to ever do the  100-meter individual medley in under 50 seconds.

2021

2020 US Olympic Trials
In total, Dressel qualified to compete in seven events at the Olympic Trials: the 50 meter freestyle, 100 meter freestyle, 200 meter freestyle, 100 meter butterfly, 200 meter butterfly, 100 meter breaststroke, and 200 meter individual medley.

On day two of the 2020 USA Swimming Olympic Trials (held in June 2021 due to the COVID-19 pandemic), June 14, 2021, Dressel competed in the 200 meter freestyle prelims in the morning, swimming a 1:46.63 and ranking 2nd overall for the heats. Dressel's swim moved him up in rankings to the all-time 20th fastest American in the event. Following his morning swim, Dressel decided not to swim in the event's semifinals.

On day four of competition, Wednesday June 16, 2021, Dressel ranked 5th out of all prelims heats in the 100 meter freestyle swimming a 48.25 and advancing to the semifinals. In the semifinals in the evening of the same day, Dressel ranked first with a time of 47.77 and advanced to the final. On day five, June 17, 2021, Dressel won the 100 m freestyle with a time of 47.39 and qualifying him for the US Olympic Swimming team in the 100 m freestyle and the 4×100 m freestyle relay for the 2020 Summer Olympics. He tied the US Open record and Championships record for the 100 meter freestyle with his swim. This marked the second Olympic Games Dressel qualified to compete at.

On day six, Dressel won the prelims heats of the 100 meter butterfly with a 50.17 breaking the US Open record and Championships record. On the same day in the semifinals, he improved further on his US Open record dropping it to a 49.76, earning Dressel the top 3 times in history in the event.

In the morning of day seven, Dressel swam a 21.29 in the prelims heats of the 50 meter freestyle, taking first, breaking the Championships record, and advancing to the semifinals. In the evening of day seven, Dressel swam in the final of the 100 meter butterfly and the semifinals of the 50 meter freestyle. In the final of the 100 meter butterfly, Dressel swam a 49.87, winning the final and swimming under 50 seconds for the fifth time. His swim qualified him to represent the United States in the 100 meter butterfly at the 2020 Summer Olympics. In the semifinals of the 50 meter freestyle, Dressel posted a 21.51, advancing as the fastest seed to the final.

On the final day, Dressel qualified to swim the 50 meter freestyle at the 2020 Olympic Games by winning the final with a time of 21.04. Dressel's swim also tied his personal best time and set a new US Open record.

Dressel's engagement with fans, including a look-alike, and embracing being a role model for swimmers across America during the Olympic Trials led Swimming World to herald Dressel as "the face of USA Swimming's men's team".

2020 Summer Olympics

Dressel was selected as one of two male USA swimming captains for the 2020 Summer Olympics in Tokyo, Japan, held in August 2021, along with Ryan Murphy.

On day three of competition, Dressel won his first medal at the 2020 Olympics swimming in the finals of the 4x100 meter freestyle relay. He helped the relay win the gold medal, swimming the relay's lead-off leg and splitting the second fastest time among his relay teammates Blake Pieroni, Bowe Becker, and Zach Apple with a 47.26.

On day four, Dressel ranked second overall in the prelims heats of the 100 meter freestyle with a time of 47.73 and advanced to the semifinals. The following morning of competition, he swam a 47.23 in his semifinal heat and advanced to the final ranking second for both semifinal heats. Dressel won his first individual Olympic gold medal in the final of the 100 meter freestyle with a time of 47.02, a new Olympic record. Dressel finished six hundredths of a second ahead of Australian Kyle Chalmers, which was a changing of Olympic champion from the 2016 Summer Olympics where Chalmers won the gold medal and Dressel finished sixth in the 100 meter freestyle. People and Parade magazines highlighted Dressel and his wife, Meghan, for their tearful reaction to him winning the 100 meter freestyle in Olympic record time, with his wife's eruption of emotion leading People to dub Meghan as their pick for the "Olympic gold medal for most celebratory spouse watching from halfway around the world in a pandemic". People not only recognized his wife, they also recognized Caeleb Dressel for his physique, naming him as their "Sexiest Olympian" for the 2020 Olympic Games.

In the evening of day six, Dressel tied the Olympic record in the 100 meter butterfly with a time of 50.39 in the prelims heats. This first Olympic record in the 100 meter butterfly Dressel set less than nine hours after setting the Olympic record in the 100 meter freestyle. In the second semifinal heat of the 100 meter butterfly on day seven, Dressel swam a 49.71 and broke the Olympic record of 50.31 Kristóf Milák set in the first semifinal heat. Later on day seven, Dressel swam three hundredths of a second off from setting a new Olympic record in the prelims of the 50 meter freestyle with his time of 21.32 and advanced to the semifinals ranked first.

On day eight, Dressel won the final of the 100 meter butterfly in a world record time of 49.45. In his second race, Dressel ranked first overall in the semifinals of the 50 meter freestyle with a time of 21.42 and advanced to the final. In his last race of the day, the final of the 4x100 meter mixed medley relay, Dressel finished in fifth place with his relay teammates Ryan Murphy, Lydia Jacoby, and Torri Huske. His world record and gold medal win in the 100 meter butterfly was chosen by Olympics.com as their number three moment in swimming at the 2020 Olympic Games.

On the final day, Dressel won the gold medal in 50 meter freestyle with an Olympic record time of 21.07. Later in the same session, Dressel won the gold medal in the 4x100 meter medley relay and set a new world record for the event of 3:26.78 in the final with his relay teammates Ryan Murphy, Michael Andrew, and Zach Apple.

By winning gold in five events at a single Olympic Games, Dressel became the fifth swimmer to achieve this feat. For the addition of the world record in the 4x100 meter medley relay to Dressel's list, he was awarded the Guinness World Record for "Most FINA world records held by an individual (current)" on August 11, 2021 for his then current 9 FINA world records. His gold medal winning performances at the 2020 Olympic Games also earned him the 2021 James E. Sullivan Award.

After the Olympic Games, Dressel took a break from swimming for a few weeks due to mental health concerns, returning to competition in late August as part of the International Swimming League. In November 2021, Dressel amicably parted ways with his long-time coach Gregg Troy, regarding whom he has said "I owe him everything." Dressel moved under the direction of Anthony Nesty, who succeeded Troy as the head coach at the University of Florida in 2018.

International Swimming League
In the 2021 International Swimming League, Dressel was selected early on in the draft process as a protected swimmer to compete for the Cali Condors again. He started his competition in the 2021 season on August 28 in the second match of the season, and the first match of the season his team competed in, earning the second-most MVP points in the match with 93 points. For the fourth match of the regular season, Dressel earned match Most Valuable Player, MVP, honors with a total of 112.5 MVP points, which was over 50 points ahead of the next-highest scorer Kelsi Dahlia also of the Cali Condors. In match six, Dressel swam a personal best time of 1:51.14 in the 200 meter individual medley, finishing second only behind Daiya Seto of the Tokyo Frog Kings. His swim also registered Dressel as the second fastest American swimmer in the event, a slim second and a half slower than American Ryan Lochte who set the world record in the event at 1:49.63 in 2012. Partway through the regular season, in mid-September 2021, Dressel and team general manager Jason Lezak decided Dressel would withdraw from competing for the remainder of the regular season and return for the playoffs.

For the first match of the playoffs season, Dressel joined fellow Cali Condors teammate and Olympian Hali Flickinger in not partaking in match competition. For the fourth match of the playoffs season, Dressel was entered on the start lists for a number of events including the 50 meter freestyle where he entered to compete against Kyle Chalmers of London Roar. Come race time, Dressel placed third the 50 meter freestyle with a time of 21.04, finishing seven-hundredths of a second behind first-place finisher Kyle Chalmers and earning 6.0 points for his team. He swam the anchor leg of the 4x100 meter freestyle relay for his next race, splitting a 47.26 and helping the relay place third. In the 4x100 meter medley relay Dressel got his first win of the match, splitting the second fastest time, a 49.60, for the butterfly leg of the relay, faster than the third-fastest split of 50.03 by Kyle Chalmers and slower than the split of 48.83 by Tom Shields of LA Current. On the second and final day of match competition, Dressel won his first individual event of the playoffs season in the 100 meter individual medley with a time of 51.67 seconds that earned his team 10.0 points. In his final race of the match, the 4x100 meter mixed medley relay, Dressel helped his relay place fifth and earn 8.0 points for the Cali Condors.

Following his playoffs match four performances, Cali Condors team manager Jason Lezak made the executive decision to have Dressel sit out of the final playoffs match so Dressel could conserve energy for the final match. On the first day of the final match, Dressel helped set new Americas and American records in the 4×100 meter medley relay with Coleman Stewart (backstroke), Nic Fink (breaststroke), and Justin Ress (freestyle), splitting a time of 49.01 seconds for the butterfly leg of the relay to help achieve a time of 3:19.64. Dressel also won the 100 meter individual medley in a time of 50.74 seconds, earning 9 points for his team, and won the 50 meter butterfly skins competition with a time of 23.05 seconds in the final head-to-head competition against Tom Shields.

2022

International team trials
The 2022 USA Swimming International Team Trials were from April 26 to April 30 in Greensboro, North Carolina. Caeleb Dressel swam the 50 freestyle, the 100 freestyle, the 50 butterfly, and the 100 butterfly. He won all four of those events and is set to swim them at the world championships in Budapest, Hungary.

2022 World Championships

On the first day of the 2022 World Championships, Dressel led-off the 4×100 meter freestyle relay in a time of 47.67 seconds, helping achieve the first relay gold medal of the Championships for the United States. The next day, he backed up the gold medal in the relay with a gold medal in the 50 meter butterfly, finishing first with a time of 22.57 seconds, which was over two-tenths of a second faster than silver medalist Nicholas Santos of Brazil.

On the fourth day of the world championships, Dressel swam the 100 meter freestyle in the prelims heats to achieve the second-fastest seed going into the semifinals, however he decided to withdraw from further competition for health reasons.

Results in major championships

 Dressel swam only in the heats.
 Dressel chose to withdraw from the 100 freestyle due to medical concerns.

Personal bests

 Dressel swam one of the fastest relay splits in history in the mixed 4x50 medley relay in 20.09. The only sub-20 splits ever were done in the same relay, when Frédérick Bousquet (19.87) and Amaury Leveaux (19.93) did so for France at the 2008 European Championships.

World Records

Long Course Meters

Short Course Meters

National Records

Long Course Meters

Short Course Meters

National/US Open Records Short Course Yards

Guinness world records
 "Most FINA world records held by an individual (current)", August 11, 2021: 9 FINA world records in swimming.

Awards and honors
 ESPY Award for Best Olympian, Men's Sports: 2022
 James E. Sullivan Award: 2021
 People, Sexiest Olympian: 2021
 FINA, Top 10 Moments: 2020 Summer Olympics (#6)
 Olympics.com, Top 5 Moments: Swimming at the 2020 Summer Olympics (#3)
 Sports Illustrated Athlete of the Year (male): 2021
 Sports Illustrated'''s Fittest 50: 2019 (#22), 2020 (#10), 2021 (#7), 2022 (#3)
 FINA Athlete of the Year in Swimming (male): 2017, 2019, 2021
 USA Swimming, Athlete of the Year: 2017, 2019, 2021
 Golden Goggle Award Male Athlete of the Year: 2017, 2019, 2021
 Golden Goggle Award Male Race of the Year (100 meter butterfly): 2017, 2019
 Golden Goggle Award Relay Performance of the Year: 2016, 2018, 2021
 Swimming World World Swimmer of the Year (male): 2017, 2019, 2021
 Swimming World American Swimmer of the Year (male): 2017, 2019, 2021
 SwimSwam Swammy Award Swimmer of the Year (male): 2017, 2019, 2020, 2021
 SwimSwam Top 100 (Men's): 2021 (#1), 2022 (#1)
 SwimSwam Swammy Award, NCAA Swimmer of the Year (male): 2017, 2018
 Southeastern Conference (SEC), Male Swimmer of the Year: 2015—2016, 2016—2017, 2017—2018
 College Swimming & Diving Coaches Association of America (CSCAA), Division-1 Swimmer of the Year (Men's): 2015—2016, 2016—2017, 2017—2018
 SwimSwam Swammy Award, Age Group Swimmer of the Year 17—18 (male): 2013
 SwimSwam Swammy Award, SwimSwam Buzz Award: 2013

Personal life
Swim analysis
Dressel began posting videos deconstructing some of his past swims to his YouTube channel in July 2020. In the first video, he analyzed one of his swims where he set a new world record in the 100-meter butterfly. He has also shared critique of his past races and swims with SwimSwam.Stewart, Mel (April 8, 2021). "Caeleb Dressel Plays Swim Nerd Analyst On The ISCA International Cup". SwimSwam. Retrieved June 26, 2021. Leading up to the 2020 Summer Olympics, he ventured into analyses of swimming in pop culture. Dressel provided his perspective to GQ on swimming scenes from various movies including scenes featuring survival swimming (such as in Cast Away and Kingsman: The Secret Service) and competitive swimming (as in Pride).

Sponsorships and collaborations
On July 19, 2018, Dressel turned professional by signing a sponsorship deal with swimwear brand Speedo. In September 2020, SPIRE Institute and Academy announced collaborations with Dressel for providing support to students of SPIRE through various avenues such as curriculum development, training, and facilities design. Leading up to the 2020 Summer Olympics, one of Dressel's sponsors, Toyota, specially designed a vehicle inspired by his tattoos.

Marriage
In 2013, Dressel started a romantic relationship with his wife, Meghan, a child counselor and former breaststroker who competed collegiately for Florida State University, and in 2019 they were engaged. In 2020, during the COVID-19 pandemic, planning the wedding was one way Dressel stayed busy during quarantine, as was hiking a 60-mile portion of the Appalachian Trail.Zaccardi, Nick (December 21, 2020). "Bone Dry: What Caeleb Dressel took away from hiking the Appalachian Trail". NBC Sports. Retrieved July 3, 2021. They married on Valentine's Day weekend,  February 13, 2021, in their shared home state of Florida.

Religion
He was raised Christian in his youth and his faith grew while in college. His large eagle tattoo was inspired by the Bible verse Isaiah 40:31, which he shared with Sports Illustrated'' in 2016 is his favorite Bible verse. During his senior year of high school, Dressel gave up swimming for a time because of his struggle with "mental demons", speaking about that period in his life Dressel said:

See also

 List of world records in swimming
 World record progression 100 metres butterfly
 World record progression 50 metres freestyle
 World record progression 100 metres individual medley
 World record progression 4 × 100 metres medley relay
 List of multiple Olympic gold medalists
 List of people from Florida
 Dressel

References

External links

 
 
 
 
 
 
 

1996 births
Living people
American male freestyle swimmers
Bolles School alumni
Florida Gators men's swimmers
Medalists at the 2016 Summer Olympics
Medalists at the 2020 Summer Olympics
Olympic gold medalists for the United States in swimming
People from Green Cove Springs, Florida
Swimmers at the 2016 Summer Olympics
Swimmers at the 2020 Summer Olympics
World Aquatics Championships medalists in swimming
World record holders in swimming
American YouTubers